The Rooks County Courthouse, located at 115 N. Walnut St. in Stockton, Kansas, was listed on the National Register of Historic Places in 2002.

It was designed by architect Frank C. Squires and was built by Cuthbert and Sons.

References

External links

Government buildings on the National Register of Historic Places in Kansas
Neoclassical architecture in Kansas
Rooks County, Kansas
Courthouses in Kansas